David Gene Schellhase Jr. (born October 14, 1944) is a retired American collegiate basketball coach and former basketball player in the National Basketball Association (NBA).

High school career
Born and raised in Evansville, Indiana, Schellhase attended North High School in Evansville.  As a freshman, he was a member of North's first winning basketball team (1958–59); he was also a member of the Pups (North Frosh) Freshman Conference (SIAC)-title team; they had an overall record of 19-3.  He led the state in scoring during his Senior year averaging 30.5 points a game, with a total of 1,325 points in his high school career. He was a member of the Indiana All-Star Team. He fell short of winning the Indiana Mr. Basketball Award to Larry Humes.

College career
After high school, Dave attended Purdue University, located in West Lafayette, Indiana. A natural small forward, he played basketball under head coach Ray Eddy. In his Senior year, he led the Boilermakers in scoring with 32.5 points a game while being named a Consensus All-American, Academic All-American and received his third straight First Team All-Big Ten selection. He was a 2nd team All-American following his junior season.  Dave scored a career high 57 points on February 19, 1966 against Michigan, the second most in school history, only behind Rick Mount's 61. With 2,074 career points he was the first of five Boilermakers to reach the 2,000 point plateau, along with Rick Mount, Joe Barry Carroll, Troy Lewis and E'Twaun Moore.

Professional career
Schellhase was selected as the 10th overall pick in the 1966 NBA Draft by the Chicago Bulls. He played 2 seasons with the Bulls, averaging 2.8 points a game with a total of 208 points in 73 games.  Schellhase starred on the front-line for the Boilers, primarily as a small forward in today's vernacular.  However, the Bulls had a larger front-line, forcing Schellhase to play out of natural position as a guard.

In 1968, he was drafted by the Phoenix Suns in the expansion draft; he did not make the final roster and subsequently began a collegiate coaching career.

Collegiate coaching career

Purdue

A few years after a brief stint playing in the NBA, Dave Schellhase served as an assistant coach under head coach George King in his last two seasons (1971–1972) on the bench. In two seasons, he helped coach Purdue to an overall record of 30-19, including an NIT appearance in 1971. Mainly an assistant to the freshman team, he joined fellow former Purdue standout, George Faerber, under coach Dave Toney.

Moorhead State

Schellhase was the head coach at Moorhead State University from 1975 to 1982, where he led the Dragons to two NSIC titles and to six NAIA Tourneys and an overall post-season record of 8-5. He was selected twice as the NSIC Coach of the Year in 1981 and 1982. In seven seasons, he left the program with a record of 137-64.

Indiana State

Schellhase moved on to coach at the Division I level, leading Sycamores for three seasons from 1982 to 1985, where he compiled a record of 37-48 and currently ranks 14th in wins in Sycamore history. He was the third former Boilermaker to coach at Indiana State after John Wooden's successful tenure from 1946 to 1948 and Bill Hodges' stint from 1979 to 1982.

Return to Moorhead State

After his tenure at ISU at the NCAA Division I level, he returned to Moorhead State in 1987 where he led the Dragons to seven NAIA Tourneys and a post-season record of 1-6. In twelve seasons from 1987 to 1999, he compiled a record of 161-176.  One of his star players, Brett Beeson, led the nation in scoring in 2003-04, before embarking on a lengthy career in foreign leagues.

During his 18-year career at Moorhead State, his overall record was 298-240 with 13 trips to the NAIA Tourney. Schellhase was the Dragons Head Coach in 1992 during their transition from NAIA to NCAA Division II.

On October 16, 2015; he was inducted into the Moorhead State 'Dragon Sports Hall of Fame'.  He remains the winningest coach at Moorhead State (298-240 .554)

Currently
Schellhase returned to coaching in Indiana at the high school level; he coached Cannelton High School for the 2001-02 season.
Schellhase has been at Logansport High School in Logansport, Indiana since 2004.  He's served as the Dean of Students as well as teaching in the Health, Physical Education Department

Head coaching record

References

External links
Dave Schellhase statistics at basketball-reference.com
Indiana Basketball Hall of Fame Profile

1944 births
Living people
All-American college men's basketball players
American men's basketball players
Basketball coaches from Indiana
Basketball players from Indiana
Chicago Bulls draft picks
Chicago Bulls players
High school basketball coaches in Indiana
Indiana State Sycamores men's basketball coaches
Minnesota State–Moorhead Dragons men's basketball coaches
Phoenix Suns expansion draft picks
Point guards
Purdue Boilermakers men's basketball coaches
Purdue Boilermakers men's basketball players
Sportspeople from Evansville, Indiana